Alexey Sergeyevich Yermolov (12 November 1847 – 4 January 1917) was a Russian politician.

Yermolov was born in 1847 (by some other sources in 1846), in 1866 graduated from the Tsarskoye Selo Lyceum, in 1871 received the Kandidat of agricultural sciences degree from the  Petersburg Agricultural Institute. Worked as a senior editor of the statistical department and member of the Research Council of the Imperial Ministry for Agriculture. He was the leader of the expedition to study sheep husbandry in the Empire. In 1883-1892 he served as the head of the Indirect taxation department of the Ministry for Economics. In 1892 he became the Deputy to Ministry for Finance. In 1893 became Minister of Agriculture and State Properties of Russian Empire and served until 1905. Since 1905 he was a member of State Council of Imperial Russia.

He was an active member of the Free Economic Society (Вольное Экономическое Общество) and published a lot of scientific articles in the Works of the Society. In 1878 he represented the society at the World Fair in Paris. In 1886-1888 he served as the Vice-President of the Society. In 1899 Yermolov was elected a member of the Russian Academy of Sciences.

Yermolov and Sergei Witte were targets of the sharp criticism by Vladimir Lenin in his work What the “Friends of the People” Are and How They Fight the Social-Democrats. According to Lenin Yermolov voiced the interests of the feudal landlords and his policy was one of retaining the relics of serfdom.

Some works
 «Новые исследования фосфоритов» (1867);
 «О добывании, переработке и употреблении кругляков ископаемой фосфорнокислой извести во Франции» (1870);
 «Фосфориты под Москвой и в Московской губернии» (1870);
 «Очерки побитюжья» (1871);
 «Высшее сельскохозяйственное образование в его отношениях к сельскому делу в России» (1872);
 «Организация теоретических и практических испытаний для решения вопроса об удобрении почв» (1872);
 «Recherches sur les gisements de phosphate de chaux fossile en Russie» (1873);
 «Сельскохозяйственное дело Европы и Америки на Венской всемирной выставке 1873 г. и в эпоху её» (1875);
 «Винокурение из стеблей кукурузы» (1878);
 «Из заграничной поездки» (1878);
 «Notice sur les céréales de la Russie» (1878);
 «Mémoire sur la production agricole de la Russie» (1878);
 «Организация полевого хозяйства» (2-е изд., 1891);
 «Сельскохозяйственно-статистическая литература на всемирной выставке в Париже 1878 г.» (1879);
 «Неурожай и народное бедствие» (1892).
 Под редакцией Ермолов напечатан перевод сочинения Ж. Билля: «Химические удобрения» (1872).
 С 1890 г. помещалась им в журнале «Русское Обозрение» сельскохозяйственная хроника; первая серия этих этюдов издана особо, под заглавием: «Современные сельскохозяйственные вопросы» (1891).

References

Politicians of the Russian Empire
Members of the State Council (Russian Empire)
1846 births
1917 deaths
Tsarskoye Selo Lyceum alumni
Active Privy Councillor (Russian Empire)